Zygmunt Adamczyk (1 May 1923 – 19 July 1985) was a former Polish footballer who played as a forward. During the interwar years Adamczyk played in Stalowa Wola. After World War Two finished, he moved to Gdańsk briefly playing with Płomień Nowy Port before joining Gedania Gdańsk, where he spent a total of 4 years with Gedania. He is then documented to have played for Lechia Gdańsk in 1949, making one appearance for the club in the I liga. His only appearance in the top flight of Polish football came on 10 April 1949 in a 3–0 defeat to Polonia Warsaw. His brother, Roman Adamczyk, also played with Adamczyk for Płomień Nowy Port, Gedania Gdańsk, and Lechia Gdańsk.

References

1923 births
1985 deaths
Gedania 1922 Gdańsk players
Lechia Gdańsk players
Polish footballers
Association football forwards